Chris Jenkins may refer to:

 Chris Jenkins (actor) (born 1987), Welsh actor
 Chris Jenkins (boxer) (born 1988), Welsh boxer
 Chris Jenkins (film producer) (born 1960/1961), Welsh film producer
 Chris Jenkins (powerlifter), Welsh powerlifter and martial artist
 Chris Jenkins (sound engineer), American sound engineer

See also
 Christopher Martin-Jenkins (1945–2013), cricket journalist
 Kris Jenkins (born 1979), American football player
 Kris Jenkins (basketball) (born 1993), American basketball player
 Jenkins (name)
 List of people with surname Jenkins